Mount Vernon Community School District is a public school district headquartered in Mount Vernon, Iowa. The district is mostly in Linn County, with a small areas in Jones and Johnson counties.  The district serves the city of Mount Vernon and surrounding areas to the west, plus an additional rural area northeast of Mount Vernon.

Greg Batenhorst was hired as superintendent in 2017.

Schools
The district operate three schools, all in Mount Vernon:

 Washington Elementary School
 Mount Vernon Middle School
 Mount Vernon High School

Mount Vernon High School

Athletics
The Mustangs compete in the WaMaC Conference in the following sports:

Baseball
 Class 2A State Champions - 1997< 
Basketball (boys and girls)
 Boys' 2-time State Champions - 1973, 2012
 Girls' Class 2A State Champions - 2010
Bowling
Cross Country (boys and girls)
 Boys' Class 3A State Champions (as Mt. Vernon-Lisbon) - 2005
 Girls' Class 3A State Champions (as Mt. Vernon-Lisbon) - 2008 
Football
 3-time Class 2A State Champions - 1974, 1993, 1994
Golf (boys and girls)
Soccer (boys and girls)
Softball
Swimming (boys and girls)
Tennis (boys and girls)
Track and Field (boys and girls)
Boys' Class 2A State Champions - 2004
 Girls' 3-time State Champions - 1985, 2009, 2010
Volleyball
 3-time State Champions - 1984, 2009, 2010 
Wrestling

Notable alumni
Matt Kroul, National Football League player
Tristan Wirfs, National Football League player

See also
List of school districts in Iowa
List of high schools in Iowa

References

External links
 Mount Vernon Community School District

School districts in Iowa
Education in Linn County, Iowa
Education in Jones County, Iowa
Education in Johnson County, Iowa
Schools in Linn County, Iowa